Arghatosh is a small town in Arghakhanchi District in Lumbini Province of southern Nepal. At the time of the 1991 Nepal census, the town had a population of 4637 living in 887 houses. At the time of the 2001 Nepal census, the population was 4627, of which 61% was literate.

References

Populated places in Arghakhanchi District